British wildwood, or simply the wildwood, is the wholly natural forested landscape that developed across major parts of Prehistoric Britain after the last ice age. It existed as the main climax vegetation in Britain for several millennia as the result of the relatively warm and moist post-glacial climate and had not yet been destroyed or modified by human intervention. From the start of the Neolithic period, this wildwood gradually gave way to open plains and fields as human populations increased and began to significantly shape and exploit the land to their advantage. The wildwood concept has been especially popularized by ecologist and countryside historian Oliver Rackham in his various works

Most of the modern woodlands that remain in England descend from the original wildwood, but are now in a semi-natural state through management, rotational felling, and exploitation for products such as timber. Where these woodlands have remained ecologically continuous since at least 1600 AD, they are known as ancient woodland. True wildwood is thought to be no longer extant in the UK.

History and Development of the Wildwood

Beginnings

The history of the British wildwood begins during the Holocene in about 11,000 – 8,000 BC, at the end of the last (Weichselian) glaciation. Although forests have in fact grown in Britain for millions of years, earlier prehistoric forest assemblages were eradicated by glaciations during previous Ice Ages. However, the last glacial retreat was followed by a period of prolonged climatic moderation unbroken by further glacial activity, which eventually gave rise to forests in the form that would probably be broadly familiar to people of Britain today. As Britain lost its ice-cover and gradually ceased to be an arctic land, the warming postglacial climate favoured the reestablishment and growth of northward dispersing trees that had previously retreated southwards during the last glacial stage. Since eastern Britain was still connected to the European continent at this time, dry land extended across the English Channel, Irish Sea and North Sea. These were passages via which plants and animals could rapidly disperse to Britain to establish native populations in the more hospitable climate.

Because there are no written records or even folk legends of what the prehistoric wildwood might have looked like, analyses of pollen and seeds preserved in stratified mineral deposits as well as radiocarbon dating of macrofossils have been necessary to reconstruct in detail the post-glacial history and floristic composition of these forests.

The First Wildwood

Trees were relatively slow to arrive in Britain compared to other early colonizing taxa such as beetles. This may in part be because the distribution of trees in Europe during the last glacial maximum was largely remote from Britain, and the only trees persisting north of the Alps were a few Boreal species such as birch, aspen and Scots pine. During the pre-Boreal period, birch (Betula pubescens and [B. pendula]) was one of the first trees to recolonize the initially barren, disturbed and largely treeless tundra landscape of Britain. This tree probably advanced freely and rapidly from the continent owing to its fast dispersal of seeds by wind and ability to thrive in harsh climates, invading mainly via the land-locked North Sea. Birch formed the earliest wildwood as it spread over almost all of Britain except at high altitudes, with its range extending northwards as least as far as Aberdeenshire. Other less dominant trees and shrubs composing this pre-Boreal wildwood, especially in the North, were aspen, willows and juniper.

Boreal Wildwood

The pre-Boreal period was followed by the Boreal period, which started about 7,500 BC and during which the climate became appreciably warmer and drier. Correspondingly, the composition of the wildwood began to change with the invasion from continental Europe of tree species able to thrive under the new conditions. The next tree after birch to invade Britain was Scots pine, which spread prolifically throughout the country thanks to the efficient and long-range dispersal of its seeds by wind, allowing the tree to colonise even the remotest areas. The success of Scots pine is also attributable to its tolerance of a wide range of soil and climatic conditions, even where these are extreme, so that it was able to maintain large monospecific stands over wide areas of Britain. It could also out-compete birch by casting a deep shade suppressing growth of birch saplings. By the mid-Boreal period, pine had probably largely replaced birth as the dominant forest species, although these species did temporarily coexist in mixed forests of birch, Scots pine and hazel throughout large parts of Northern England.
 
Pine was followed sequentially by hazel, elm (particularly wych elm), oak, and alder; all of which spread readily throughout Britain except the far North of Scotland. However, the newly arrived species did not suddenly roll up from the south in successive waves of mass invasion, nor did they completely replace the tree species already present. Rather, each newly arrived species would have remained relatively rare and advanced in small numbers long before becoming widespread and increasing to its maximum abundance. Moreover, the tree species and floristic composition of the wildwood would have varied across the country in accordance with the local climate, soil type and underlying topography. For example, hazel expanded into Scotland in areas occupied only by birch to form birch-hazel forests, while forests comprising assemblages of oak, elm, and hazel rapidly occupied large parts of lowland England. These specific Boreal tree assemblages were apparently unique to prehistoric Britain, with no modern analogues existing in Europe.

Atlantic Wildwood

During the Atlantic period, the climate became persistently warmer, wetter and more stable, and the development of the British wildwood culminated with the invasion of new deciduous species from southern Europe such as small-leaved lime. Small-leaved lime arrived in Britain around 5500 – 3000 BC, and it eventually spread to form extensive areas of continuous limewood in the English lowlands, reaching its maximum during the Holocene climatic optimum. Under the moister conditions, alder was also able to thrive, and it became increasingly common and widespread on the fringes of lakes and peat basins.

Since the start of this prolonged Atlantic period of apparent climate stability, there was a progressive rise in sea levels that eventually cut off Ireland, then Britain off from the European continent. Consequently, the newly formed English Channel, Irish Sea and North Sea presented barriers to invasion of more new species, so that natural succession of pre-established species was allowed to take its course over several thousand years. As a result, the landscape of Britain developed into a patchwork of 5 broad wildwood provinces determined largely by local geography. These provinces were (1) pine in the eastern Scottish Highlands; (2) birch in the western Scottish Highlands; (3) oak-hazel in southern Scotland, northern England, most of Wales, and parts of Ireland; (4) hazel-elm across most of Ireland and southwest Wales; and (5) lime in lowland England. 
Lime, elm, and oak were the commonest wildwood trees of the Atlantic period, whilst Scots pine became increasingly rare, being restricted to the Scottish Highlands and dominating nowhere. The wildwood provinces were not strictly subdivided, since they would also have contained small numbers of trees that were commoner in other provinces.

The subdivision of the prehistoric British wildwood into several different provinces, each with their own distinct tree assemblage, stands in contrast to the popular preconception that the dominant natural climax vegetation would have consisted entirely of uniform stands of oak. Although oak was widespread in Britain during the Atlantic period and would have been present in the various wildwoods, it would rarely have been the most dominant tree.

Sub-Boreal and Sub-Atlantic Wildwoods

The end of the Atlantic period was characterized by a relatively brief but significant return to cooler and drier conditions, which marks the start of sub-Boreal period. Many changes to the wildwood character occurred during this renewed climatic shift. The most distinctive of these changes was a widespread decline of elm across the country, which is associated with a sudden increase in agricultural weeds such as Plantago species and nettle, as well as early Neolithic settlement. Lime also declined and hazel became more abundant through the impacts of Neolithic peoples on the landscape.

Pine and birch temporarily spread and became dominant again owing to the cooler and drier conditions. However, in about 700 – 750 BC, the climate became wetter and much colder again, resulting in the extension of peat bogs over much of Ireland, Scotland, and northern England, and destroying large areas of sub-Boreal pine and birch forest.

The sub-Boreal period also saw the invasion of even later arrivals to Britain such as beech, hornbeam, and field maple. Beech first appeared in southeast England in about 1,000 BC, and its dispersal from northwest France would have required it to cross the English Channel that had now fully formed. It has been hypothesized that the most likely agents for the dispersal of beech propagules were birds such as jays and ravens.

Climate of the Wildwood 

From about 8000 BC to about between 4300 and 3100 BC ran the Atlantic climatic period. The wildwood developed under this relatively stable Holocene Atlantic climate, although there were minor temperature fluctuations over the millennia. Conditions were initially cold and dry during the pre-Boreal, which favoured relatively arctic species with wider northerly distributions such as birch, willow, and juniper. Progression towards the climatic optimum during the relatively warm and wet Atlantic period favoured species with more southerly distributions in Europe.

Animal Species

Extinct or Rare species

The British Wildwood housed many animals that are now considered extinct or very rare. Such animals include the Aurochs, Beaver, Brown Bear, Wild Boar, Water Voles, Goshawk, Pine Marten, Dormouse, Roe Deer, Red Kite, Turtle Dove, Wolf, Red Squirrel, Osprey, Pearl-Bordered Fritillary, Lynx, White-tailed Eagle, and Wild Horses. Of these animals, the White-Tailed Eagle and the Goshawk has been reintroduced in southern Britain.

Species that can still be found today

There have been animals that existed during the Wildwood period and still exist to this day throughout Britain. Such animals include: Bees, Black Grouse, Curlew, Hedgehog, Lapwing, Mountain Hare, Natterjack Toad, Red Fox, Red Deer, Ring Ouzel, Salmon. Since the eradication of natural British Wildwood, none of the animals that still exist today are naturally from natural wildwood.

Ecology and Structure

The dynamics governing the structure of the prehistoric climax wildwood have been the subject of strong debate. Given the absence of direct observational evidence, there are two opposing views regarding the structure of the wildwood landscape. The traditional view is that the wildwood was a uniformly tall, static climax forest with an almost completely closed canopy. On the other hand, Dutch ecologist Frans Vera argued that the structure of the prehistoric woodland in western and central Europe comprised a dynamic mosaic of woodland groves, scrub and open grassland regulated by large herbivores and would have reassembled modern wood-pasture, an assumption known as the wood-pasture hypothesis. Fossil records of closed canopy and open land beetle assemblages now suggest that the structure of the UK wildwood was intermediate between these extremes. 

During the Mesolithic, the British wildwood ecosystem comprised a relatively closed canopy interspersed with small but significant gaps. The relatively closed state of the canopy is evidenced by the preponderance of shade-tolerant species at this time such as elm and lime. Although impacts of herbivore grazing are acknowledged to have played an appreciable role in shaping the wildwood landscape of Mesolithic Britain, other disturbance factors such as forest fires, insect attacks, flooding, windthrow from storms and natural death of trees are thought to have been more important in creating these woodland gaps.

Decline and Disappearance

During the Neolithic period around 6000 BC, the British wildwood began to decline as the impacts of agriculture became more widespread and persistent, agricultural practices became more sedentary, and farming technology improved with the advent of metal tools. Although Mesolithic peoples had previously cleared forests to create open areas for hunting and gathering, the impacts they exerted would have been minimal and localized.

In the English lowlands, lime initially was extensively grubbed up to make way for agriculture, since this tree typically grew on the most fertile, well-drained soils. By the Bronze Age, civilization had proceeded to encroach on much of the wildwood in the remoter upland places such as the Scottish Highlands, northern England, and Wales. It is estimated that by the Iron Age, over 50% of the original wildwood covering Britain had been cleared.

References

External links 
 
 

Landscape
Habitats
Geography of England